Roberto Marcelo Levingston Laborda (January 10, 1920 – June 17, 2015) was an Argentine Army general who was President of Argentina from June 18, 1970 to March 22, 1971, during the Revolución Argentina period in Argentine history.

Early life and education
Levingston was born in San Luis Province, and graduated from the Colegio Militar de la Nación in 1941.

On 18 December 1943, Levingston married Betty Nelly Andrés (born 4 May 1926) and had two sons and one daughter, Roberto, Maria and Alberto.

Presidency
Levingston's military expertise included intelligence and counterinsurgency, and he took the presidency of Argentina on June 18, 1970 in a military coup that deposed Juan Carlos Onganía over his ineffective response to the Montoneros and other guerillas. His regime was marked by a protectionist economic policy that did little to overcome the inflation and recession that the country was undergoing at the time, and by the imposition of the death penalty against terrorists and kidnappers. In response to renewed anti-government rioting in Córdoba and to the labor crisis under his leadership, he was deposed on March 21, 1971 by another military junta led by Alejandro Lanusse.

Death
He died on  June 17, 2015, at the age of 95.

References

People from San Luis Province
Presidents of Argentina
Argentine generals
Argentine people of French descent
Argentine people of Scottish descent
Argentine people of Spanish descent
1920 births
2015 deaths
Burials at La Chacarita Cemetery